Deadbeat is an American supernatural comedy series created by Cody Heller and Brett Konner about medium Kevin Pacalioglu, played by Tyler Labine, and was first released on Hulu on April 9, 2014. Three seasons were broadcast before Hulu canceled the series on June 5, 2016.

Plot
Kevin "Pac" Pacalioglu (Tyler Labine) is a lazy slacker, and a medium for hire, who attempts to solve various ghosts' unresolved issues, so that they can move on to a final resting place.  During Season 1 and 2, with the help of his best friend and drug dealer, Roofie (Brandon T. Jackson), Kevin was interfering with Camomile White (Cat Deeley) to stop her from causing harm to people as a false medium.  During his issues with Camomile he tries to date her quiet and reluctant personal assistant, Sue Tabernacle (Lucy DeVito), who dies in an accident and ends up as a ghost who can't move on living in Kevin's apartment.  In Season 1, Pac competes against Camomile for work, whereas in Season 2, Camomile becomes a TV Host while blackmailing Kevin into being her "bodyguard" and takes advantage of his talents for her gain. After the events in Season 2, Kevin moves into an apartment with Clyde (Kal Penn) and works with a medium known as "Danny Poker" (Kurt Braunohler) who uses his talent to win at Poker competitions.

Cast and characters

Main
 Tyler Labine as Kevin "Pac" Pacalioglu: a stoner and medium who uses his ability to communicate with ghosts as a means to make a living.
 Brandon T. Jackson as Rufus "Roofie" Jones (seasons 1-2): Kevin's only friend and drug dealer.
 Lucy DeVito as Sue Tabernacle (seasons 1-2): Camomile's timid assistant.
 Cat Deeley as Camomile White (seasons 1-2): a famous medium, and occasional rival of Kevin, who lacks the actual ability to communicate with ghosts.
 Kal Penn as Clyde Shapiro (season 3): Kevin's roommate.
 Kurt Braunohler as Danny Poker (season 3): another medium who uses his skills for profit.

Recurring

 Brad Williams as Tyson
 Matthew Porretta as Crosby / Matthew Biscotti
 Modi as Menachem Mendel
 Meryl Hathaway as Millie
 Todd Alan Crain as Wesley
 Megan Neuringer as Nurse
 Paul Fitzgerald as Detective Crosby, himself
 Samantha Bee as Darcy
 Godfrey as Shaky Hands
 Adrian Martinez as Hector
 Teresa Yenque as Zoila (season 2)
 Lauren Adams as Carol (season 3)

Guest

 Alex Karpovsky as Jerryd the Liar
 Ross Marquand as Hugh Janus
 Efren Ramirez as Manny
 Lynn Cohen as Edith Jane
 Joe Pantoliano as Famous Actor
 Todd Barry as Daniel L. Turner
 Jason Biggs as Reed Kelly
 Peter Grosz as Jeremy Goldberg
 Darrell Hammond as Don Soderbergh
 Iliza Shlesinger as Shelly
 Ray Wise as Mayor Meyer
 Fred Armisen as Dead Janitor
 Michael Ian Black as TJ
 Danny DeVito as Giuseppe Monamocce
 James Franco as Johnny Penis
 Gilbert Gottfried as Suicidal Man
 Zachary Levi as Abraham Lincoln
 Jim Norton as Carl
 Geoffrey Owens as Arthur
 Dean Edwards as Gucci Man

Overview

Reception

On Rotten Tomatoes, the first season received a score of 80% based on 10 reviews.  The site's critical consensus states, "Deadbeat aims low and scores high thanks to its promising, crass comedy and willingness to indulge in the bizarre."

International broadcasters
In Australia, the series premiered on April 15, 2015 on The Comedy Channel. In India the show premiered on July 8, 2015 on Comedy Central India. In Spain the show was broadcast by Comedy Central Spain. In Canada the show is on the streaming service Crave TV.

Home media
In 2014, Season 1 was released on DVD exclusively through Target.

References

External links
 
 

2010s American comedy television series
2014 American television series debuts
2016 American television series endings
English-language television shows
Hulu original programming
Television series by Lionsgate Television